Read My Lips is the debut solo album by Tim Curry, released in 1978. It was produced by Bob Ezrin with Michael Kamen as the associate producer. The opening track "Birds of a Feather" had already appeared a year earlier in 1977, performed by its composers Carole Pope and Kevan Staples on Rough Trade Live! Direct to Disc, the debut album of their band Rough Trade. The song "Sloe Gin" was covered by Joe Bonamassa in 2007 on his album of the same title.

Track listing

Side A
"Birds of a Feather" (Carole Pope, Kevan Staples) - 4:07
"Wake Nicodemus" (Henry Clay Work, originally published in 1864) - 4:37
"I Will" (John Lennon, Paul McCartney) - 3:41
"Brontosaurus" (Roy Wood) - 4:38
"Alan" (Tony Kosinec) - 4:25

Side B
"All I Want" (Joni Mitchell) - 4:24
"Sloe Gin" (Bob Ezrin, Michael Kamen) - 5:25
"Harlem on My Mind" (Irving Berlin) - 3:51
"Anyone Who Had a Heart" (Burt Bacharach, Hal David) - 3:44

Personnel
Tim Curry - vocals
Dick Wagner - lead and rhythm guitar
Nils Lofgren - accordion
Tony Kosinec - acoustic guitar
Bob Babbitt - bass guitar
Allan Schwartzberg - drums
Charles Collins - drums
John Tropea - rhythm guitar
Robin Millar - rhythm guitar, mandolin
Donny Brook (Don F Brooks) - harmonica 
Lee Michaels - keyboards
Michael Kamen - keyboards, arrangements
Bob Ezrin - keyboards, percussion, backing vocals, arrangements
Jimmy Maelen - percussion 
Ernie Watts - saxophone
Max Kaminsky - trumpet
Joe Venuti - violin
Rudy Toth - dulcimer
Brooks Hunnicutt, Dennis Tufano - backing vocals
Elizabeth Lennard - photography

1978 debut albums
Tim Curry albums
Albums produced by Bob Ezrin
A&M Records albums